Adrian Francis Cruft (10 February 1921 – 20 February 1987) was a British composer.

Cruft, the son of the double-bassist Eugene Cruft was educated at Westminster Abbey Choir School, Westminster School, and as a Boult conducting scholar at the Royal College of Music from 1938, completing his studies there briefly in 1946-1947 after service in World War II. He was a composition student of Gordon Jacob and Edmund Rubbra but also studied double bass with his father. Cruft became chairman of the Composers' Guild of Great Britain 1966.

Cruft, called a "performers' composer" by Roderick Swanston in an article in The Musical Times a couple of years after his death was, as a young chorister at Westminster Abbey, influenced by the revival of Tudor music and later by the counterpoint of Bach. Grove's music dictionary calls his music "diatonic, firmly based in tradition and generally straightforward in idiom". He composed church music as well as orchestral works and chamber music.

Notes

References
Cole, Hugh & Cruft, John, "Cruft, Adrian (Francis)", Grove Music Online, ed. L. Macy (Accessed 3 May 2006).
Rubbra, Edmund, "The music of Adrian Cruft", The Musical Times, 1969, p. 822-825.
Swanston, Roderick, "The music of Adrian Cruft", The Musical Times, 1991, p. 119-123.

External links
Adrian Cruft's papers are held in the archives of the Royal College of Music: Adrian Cruft's papers in the AIM25 database (Archives in London and the M25 area).

1921 births
1987 deaths
Alumni of the Royal College of Music
People educated at Westminster Abbey Choir School
Choristers at Westminster Abbey
20th-century classical musicians
20th-century English composers
British military personnel of World War II